Sympodomyces is a genus of fungi in the family Laboulbeniaceae. A monotypic genus, it contains the single species Sympodomyces pentacellularis.

References

External links
Sympodomyces at Index Fungorum

Laboulbeniomycetes
Monotypic Laboulbeniomycetes genera